The Olympic Peninsula is a large arm of land in western Washington that lies across Puget Sound from Seattle, and contains Olympic National Park. It is bounded on the west by the Pacific Ocean, the north by the Strait of Juan de Fuca, and the east by Hood Canal. Cape Alava, the westernmost point in the contiguous United States, and Cape Flattery, the northwesternmost point, are on the peninsula. It remained largely unmapped until Arthur Dodwell and Theodore Rixon mapped most of its topography and timber resources between 1898 and 1900.

Geography
Clallam and Jefferson Counties, as well as the northern parts of Grays Harbor and Mason Counties, are on the peninsula. The Kitsap Peninsula, bounded by the Hood Canal and Puget Sound, is an entirely separate peninsula and is not connected to the Olympic Peninsula.

From Olympia, the state capital, U.S. Route 101 runs along the Olympic Peninsula's eastern, northern, and western shorelines.

The Olympic mountain range sits in the center of the Olympic Peninsula. This range is the second largest in Washington State. Its highest peak is Mt. Olympus.

A major effort called the Wild Olympics campaign is under way to protect additional wilderness areas on the Olympic Peninsula, protect salmon streams under the Wild and Scenic River Act and provide a means for Olympic National Park to offer to buy land adjacent to the Park from willing sellers.

Climate

Most of the peninsula has an oceanic climate, or Cfb under the Köppen climate classification. Most populated areas, however, have a warm-summer Mediterranean climate, or Csb.

The Olympic Peninsula is home to temperate rain forests, including the Hoh, Queets Rain Forest, and Quinault. Rain forest vegetation is concentrated primarily in the western part of the peninsula, as the interior mountains create a rain shadow effect in areas to the northeast, resulting in a much drier climate in those locales.

Rivers
Major salmon-bearing rivers on the Olympic Peninsula include, clockwise from the southwest, the Humptulips, the Quinault, the Queets, the Quillayute, Bogachiel, the Sol Duc, the Lyre, the Elwha (see Elwha Ecosystem Restoration), the Dungeness, the Dosewallips, the Hamma Hamma, the Skokomish, and the Wynoochee River.

Lakes
Natural lakes on the peninsula include Lake Crescent, Lake Ozette, Lake Sutherland, Lake Quinault, and Lake Pleasant. Two dammed rivers form the reservoirs of Lake Cushman and Wynoochee Lake; two previous reservoirs, destroyed in the Elwha Ecosystem Restoration were Lake Aldwell (behind the former Elwha Dam) and Lake Mills (behind the former Glines Canyon Dam).

Parks
The peninsula contains many state and national parks, including Anderson Lake, Bogachiel, Dosewallips, Fort Flagler, Fort Worden, Lake Cushman, Mystery Bay, Old Fort Townsend, Potlatch, Sequim Bay, Shine Tidelands, and Triton Cove state parks; Olympic National Park; and the Olympic National Forest. Within the Olympic National Forest, there are five designated wilderness areas: The Brothers, Buckhorn, Colonel Bob, Mt. Skokomish, and Wonder Mountain. Just off the west coast is the Washington Islands Wilderness.

Politics 
The Olympic Peninsula is represented in the U.S. House of Representatives by Democrat Derek Kilmer. It is represented in the Washington State Legislature by Democratic state senator Kevin Van De Wege and Democratic state representatives Mike Chapman and Steve Tharinger.

Gallery

Cities and towns in the Olympic Peninsula

Population of at least 10,000

Port Angeles
Aberdeen
Shelton

Population of at least 5,000

Hoquiam
Ocean Shores
Port Townsend
Sequim

Population of at least 1,000

Forks
Port Hadlock
Port Ludlow

Population of less than 1,000

Amanda Park
Brinnon
Chimacum
Clallam Bay
Discovery Bay
Eldon
Hoodsport
Humptulips
Kalaloch
La Push
Lilliwaup
Moclips
Neah Bay
Ocean City
Ozette
Pacific Beach
Potlatch
Quilcene
Quinault
Sekiu
Union

References

External links

Olympic National Park
University of Washington Libraries Digital Collections – The Pacific Northwest Olympic Peninsula Community Museum A web-based museum showcasing aspects of the rich history and culture of Washington State's Olympic Peninsula communities.  Features cultural exhibits, curriculum packets and a searchable archive of over 12,000 items that includes historical photographs, audio recordings, videos, maps, diaries, reports and other documents.

 PBS - Scraping together Mt. Olympus - Nick on the Rocks on YouTube

Peninsulas of Washington (state)
Landforms of Clallam County, Washington
Landforms of Jefferson County, Washington
Landforms of Grays Harbor County, Washington
Landforms of Mason County, Washington